Joy Howland (born 21 January 1971) is a former association football player who represented New Zealand at international level.

Howland made her Football Ferns début in a 0–0 draw with Korea Republic on 23 March 1986, and finished her international career with four caps to her credit.

References

1971 births
Living people
New Zealand women's association footballers
New Zealand women's international footballers
Women's association footballers not categorized by position